{{DISPLAYTITLE:C12H6Cl4O2S}}
The molecular formula C12H6Cl4O2S (molar mass: 356.05 g/mol, exact mass: 353.8843 u) may refer to:

 Bithionol
 Tetradifon